= Mabel Edmund =

Mabel Edmund (1930–2009) was an Australian Indigenous rights activitst, artist and author known for being the first Aboriginal woman elected to local government in Australia.

== Biography ==
Edmund was born in Rockhampton, Queensland to Isabel Wallace and John Mann, the youngest of their six children. From the late 1960s, Edmund was deeply involved in political and community advocacy. She worked as a Labor Party organiser, served as a local government councillor with Livingstone Shire Council from 1969 to 1975, and held leadership roles within Indigenous organisations, including the Aboriginal and Torres Strait Islander Legal Service and the Aboriginal Loans Commission. Earlier in life, she worked as a stockwoman at properties including Bombandy and Rosedale in Queensland.

From the mid-1980s, Edmund also established herself as a painter and later as an autobiographer, documenting Indigenous experiences and perspectives. In recognition of her service to Indigenous communities and public life, she was appointed a Member of the Order of Australia (AM) in 1986.

== Career ==
- Indigenous rights activist/supporter (1968-2000) Queensland, Australia
- labour party organiser (1968-1975) Queensland, Australia
- local government councillor (1969-1975) Queensland, Australia
- Indigenous leader (1970-1990) Queensland, Australia
- painter (1985-2000) Queensland, Australia
- autobiographer/memoirist (1990-1992) Queensland, Australia

== Works ==
- Hello, Johnny!: Stories of my aboriginal and South Sea Islander family
- No Regrets
